The Wild and the Innocent is a 1959 American CinemaScope Western film directed by Jack Sher and starring Audie Murphy and Sandra Dee as two inexperienced young people who get into trouble when they visit a town for the very first time.
The film was the final Universal-International film shot in CinemaScope.

Plot
Shy and naive mountain trapper Yancy (Audie Murphy) travels through Wyoming with his uncle and his Indian wife. After Uncle Lije (George Mitchell) is injured by a bear, Yancy is sent to trade their beaver pelts for money and supplies. When he arrives at the trading post, he finds it has been burnt down by an Indian who was sold moonshine by a lazy sneak thief, Ben Stocker (Strother Martin). The trading post owner tells Yancy that he will have to ride two more days to Casper, Wyoming, the nearest town to trade his furs. Stocker tries to trade his oldest daughter Rosalie (Sandra Dee) to Yancy for some furs, but is rebuffed. The next day, Yancy finds that Rosalie has run away from her father and wants him to take her to town.

When they reach the town and he trades his furs, Yancy gets Rosalie some new clothes so she will be presentable to look for a job. Paul Bartell (Gilbert Roland), the town's corrupt sheriff, says he will find Rosalie a job at the dance hall, and Yancy believes that this will be alright. He later finds out what really goes on at the dance hall and goes to get Rosalie. Bartell, who intends to earn good money with Rosalie, refuses to let the girl go, and Yancy is forced to shoot him in self-defense.

The next day, Yancy is loading up to leave for the mountains, while he intends for Rosalie to stay at the general store and be cared for by Mr. Forbes (Jim Backus) and his wife (Betty Harford). However, Rosalie refuses to part with him, and in the end Uncle Lije and Yancy head into the mountains with Rosalie riding on the back of Yancy’s horse.

Cast
 Audie Murphy as Yancy Hawks
 Joanne Dru as Marcy Howard
 Gilbert Roland as Sheriff Paul Bartell
 Jim Backus as Cecil Forbes
 Sandra Dee as Rosalie Stocker
 George Mitchell as Uncle Lije Hawks
 Peter Breck as Chip
 Strother Martin as Ben Stocker
 Wesley Marie Tackitt as Ma Ransome
 Betty Harford as Mrs. Forbes
 Mel Leonard as Pitchman
 Lillian Adams as Kiri Hawks
 Val Benedict as Richie
 Jim Sheppard as Henchman
 Edson Stroll as Henchman (as Ed Stroll)
 John Qualls as Henchman
 Frank Wolff as Henchman 
 Rosemary Eliot as Dancehall Girl
 Barboura Morris as Dancehall Girl
 Louise Glenn as Dancehall Girl
 Stephen Roberts as Bouncer
 Karyn Kupcinet as Townswoman (as Tammy Windsor)

Production
Filming took place in Big Bear Lake, California.

See also
 List of American films of 1959

References

External links

1959 films
1950s Western (genre) comedy films
Audie Murphy
1959 romantic comedy films
Films directed by Jack Sher
American Western (genre) comedy films
Films scored by Hans J. Salter
Films with screenplays by Jack Sher
Films set in Wyoming
Films shot in Big Bear Lake, California
1950s English-language films
1950s American films